1991 in professional wrestling describes the year's events in the world of professional wrestling.

List of notable promotions 
These promotions held notable shows in 1991.

Calendar of notable shows

Accomplishments and tournaments

WCW

WWF

Awards and honors

Pro Wrestling Illustrated

Wrestling Observer Newsletter

Title changes

WWF

WCW

Births
January 9 - Ruby Riott, American wrestler
January 17 - Alexander Hammerstone 
January 28 - Bronson Matthews, American wrestler
February 4 - Santana
February 5 - Brennan Williams, American wrestler
February 7 - Hikuleo
February 12 - Boby Zavala, Mexican luchador
February 15 - Rich Swann
February 19 - David Starr
April 4 - Laurel Van Ness, Canadian female wrestler
May 6 - Doudrop, Scottish wrestler 
May 13 - Scarlett Bordeaux 
May 31 - Cody Hall, American wrestler
June 12 - Tomoyuki Oka, Japanese wrestler
June 19 - Dilsher Shanky 
June 25 - Kennadi Brink
June 25 - Jessika Carr 
July 7 - Josh Woods, American wrestler
July 18 - Mandy Rose
July 21 - Adam Page, American wrestler
August 9 - Alexa Bliss
September 27 - Ortiz 
December 8 - Sarah Bäckman 
December 18 - Flip Gordon 
December 21 - Otis Dozovic, American wrestler

Debuts
Uncertain debut date
Michael Modest
May 5 - Hayabusa
July 7 - Road Dogg 
November 20 - Disco Inferno

Retirements
 Rocky Johnson (1964–1991)
 Angelo Poffo (1949–1991)
 Smith Hart (1973–1991)
 Trudy Adams (1987–1991)
 Tojo Yamamoto (1953–1991)
 Ron Bass (1971–1991)
 S. D. Jones (1971–1991)
 Bugsy McGraw (1967–1991)
 Bobby Jaggers (1972–1991)
 Cody Michaels (1986–1991)
 Dennis Stamp (1971–1991)
 Donna Christianello (1963–1991)
 Harley Race (1960–1991)
 Itzuki Yamazaki (1981–1991)
 Lady Blossom (1979–1991)
 Joyce Grable (1971–1991)
 Mark Rocco (1972–1991)
 Mike George (1969–1991)
 Buzz Sawyer (1978-1991)

Deaths
 January 21 – Nick Gulas, American wrestling promoter (b. 1914)
 April 23 - Frankie Williams (wrestler), American wrestler (b. 1940)
 June 30 – Duke Keomuka, Japanese wrestler (b. 1921)
 August 15- Tank Morgan, American wrestler (b. 1933)
 August 25 – Vivian Vachon, Canadian wrestler (b. 1951)
 August 27 – Martín Karadagian, Argentina wrestler (b. 1922) 
 September 12 – Chris Von Erich, American wrestler (b. 1969)
October 27 - Rocky Hata, Japanese wrestler (b. 1948) 
 October 31 – Gene Anderson, American wrestler (b. 1939)
 November 10 – Dick the Bruiser, American wrestler (b. 1929)
 November 9 - Abe Yourist, Russian wrestler (b. 1909) 
 November 12 – Ripper Collins, American wrestler (b. 1933)
 December 25 – Wilbur Snyder, American wrestler (b. 1929)

See also
List of WCW pay-per-view events
List of WWF pay-per-view events
List of FMW supercards and pay-per-view events

References

 
professional wrestling